The 2012 Nigeria Premier League is the 41st season of the competition since its inception, and the 22nd since the rebranding of the league as the "Professional League".

Sixteen teams from the previous season and four teams promoted from the Nigeria National League                       
(Akwa United, Rising Stars, Jigawa Golden Stars and Wikki Tourists) are participating in this season.

The season was originally due to start November 26, 2011, less than a month after the conclusion of the previous season due to many long delays by the NFF. The date was pushed back to January 2012 to give time to organize and to sort out the league's sponsorship and scheduled to run to July.

Clubs

League table

News
- In addition to the Kaduna United v Jigawa week 1 game, te entire week 2 schedule was postponed due to the nationwide general strike protesting the removal of the national fuel subsidy.
- Two matchday 4 matches were cancelled: SUnshine Stars FC was robbed on the way to their game with Lobi, and Kano Pillars vs Enyimba was postponed after a bombing attributed to Boko Haram. Pillars eventually announced they were moving games to Jigawa's Hadeja Stadium. The league relented and allowed Pillars to play in Kano behind closed doors.
- A week 11 match was postponed when Wikki Tourists were robbed on their way to Warri.

Team of the Year
From MTNFootball

GK- Chigozie Agbim (Warri Wolves)
DF- Namso Edo (Akwa United)
DF- Mutiu Adegoke (3SC)
DF- Azubuike Egwuekwe (Warri Wolves)
DF- Godfrey Oboabona (Sunshine Stars F.C.)
MF- Ejike Uzoenyi (Enugu Rangers)
MF- Philip Asuquo (3SC)
MF- Reuben Gabriel (Kano Pillars)
FW- Mohammed Gambo (Kano Pillars) 
FW- Abdulrahman Bashir (ABS FC)
FW- Sibi Gwar (Niger Tornadoes)
Coach-Mohammed Baba Ganaru (Kano Pillars)

Reserves 
GK: Moses Ocheje (Sunshine Stars) 
D:  ThankGod Ike (Warri Wolves) 
D/M:Chinedu Efugh (Heartland) 
M:  David Tyavkase (Lobi Stars)
M: Abduljaleel Ajagun (Dolphin)   
F:  Dele Olorundare (Sunshine Stars) 
F:  Chikeluba Ofoedu (Rangers)

Managerial (head coach) changes

References

External links
Official website
Official NFF website 

Nigeria Professional Football League seasons
Nigeria
1